Harry Parker was an English footballer who made 54 appearances in the Football League playing for Glossop and Lincoln City. He played non-league football in the Leicestershire area, for Castle Donington and Midland League club Whitwick White Cross. He played as an outside left or inside left.

References

Year of birth missing
Year of death missing
Place of birth missing
English footballers
Association football forwards
Glossop North End A.F.C. players
Whitwick White Cross F.C. players
Lincoln City F.C. players
English Football League players
Midland Football League players
Place of death missing